Gebere Dam is a dam in Turkey.

Sources
  www.dsi.gov.tr/tricold/gebere.htm Site of the Turkish government agency of hydraulic works

Gebere
Dams completed in 1941